Stockyard Creek is a locality between Hamley Bridge and Owen, South Australia in the Mid North region of South Australia.

The private subdivision of Bartleville was laid out by Thomas Bartlett in 1881 to the north of the Stockyard Creek railway station. There was a post office and several railway cottages near the station, but very little remains now.

References

Towns in South Australia